There is no active rail transport in Belize, although there were lines in the past.

Overview 
Historically, one of the major railways in Belize was the Stann Creek Railway used by United Fruit, which connected Middlesex Estate with the port of Dangriga. The railway was  narrow gauge, and operated from 1913 till 1937, when it was abandoned. Many remains are still visible along the Hummingbird Highway (between Dangriga and Belmopan). This road uses some of the old railway bridges, though they are gradually disappearing as bridges are modernized.

A second abandoned railway ran from Hill Bank, at the south end of a lagoon on the New River, west through Sierra de Agua to Gallon Jug, an abandoned community about 10 km from the Guatemala border.

There have been no railway connections to other countries.

See also 
 Belize
 Transport in Belize

References 

Railways of the Caribbean by David Rollinson (2001, Macmillan, Oxford England)  (see link)

External links 

 Railways and Trains in Belize. A Guide to the Past with facts, pictures and background information to the Belize railway history.
 History of Belize with a mention of the railway and a picture with a train in Dangriga port.

 
3 ft gauge railways in Belize